South Carolina Highway 45 (SC 45) is a  primary state highway in the U.S. state of South Carolina. It serves as the main thoroughfare in northern Berkeley County.

Route description

History
Established as an original state highway in 1922, it traversed from SC 41 in St. Stephen to SC 31 in St. Matthews. By 1931, SC 45 was extended west on new primary routing to SC 24 in Pelion.

In 1939, SC 45 was rerouted onto new primary routing west of Eutawville to its current northern terminus with US 15/SC 31 in Wells. The section of road from Eutawville west to Swansea became part of SC 6; Swansea to Pelion became SC 69.

In 1942, both Santee Reservoir (Lake Marion) and Pinopolis Reservoir (Lake Moultrie) begin to be filled causing SC 45 to be altered.  SC 45 was rerouted southeast along SC 6 to Cross then north around Lake Moultrie to meet back with the original SC 45 east of Eadytown; the old alignment became secondary roads  Fredcon Road (S-38-137) and Edgewater Road (S-8-31) with the rest under Lake Marion.  In 1948, SC 45 was truncated west again of St. Stephen onto US 52; however a year later it was extended back to SC 179, near Jamestown.  In 1950, SC 45 was rerouted west of Cross onto new primary routing and bridge over the Diversion Canal; the old alignment that hugged Lake Moultrie's shoreline became secondary road Ranger Drive (S-8-132).  Around 1952, SC 45 was taken off a  concurrency with US 52 and given a new routing between Pineville and St. Stephen; this left behind Colonel Manham Drive (S-8-6).  Also, SC 45 was extended east to Jamestown, in concurrency with US 17 Alt., then continue southeast, replacing SC 173, to its current southern terminus with US 17/US 701, in McClellanville.  In the late 1990s, a one-block concurrency was eliminated in St. Stephen.

Major intersections

See also

References

External links

 
 Mapmikey's South Carolina Highways Page: SC 45

045
Transportation in Charleston County, South Carolina
Transportation in Berkeley County, South Carolina
Transportation in Orangeburg County, South Carolina